Tony is an English masculine given name that occurs as a diminutive form of Anthony in many countries. As a diminutive form of Antonia, it is found in Denmark, Finland, Greenland, Norway, and Sweden. It has been among the top 600 most popular male baby names in the United States since the late 19th century and was among the top 200 from the beginning of the 20th century to the 1990s.

People
Tony Abbott (born 1957), Australian politician
Tony Acquaviva (1925–1986), American composer and conductor
Tony Adams (disambiguation), multiple people
Tony An (born 1978), South Korean singer, member of boy band H.O.T.
Tony Armas (born 1953), Venezuelan baseball player
Tony Armas Jr. (born 1978), Venezuelan baseball player, son of Tony Armas
Tony Arnerich (born 1979), American baseball player
Tony Atlas (born 1954), American wrestler
Tony Binarelli (1940–2022), Italian magician
Tony Blair (born 1953), British politician
Antony Blinken (born 1962), American government administrator and secretary of state
Tony Benn (1925–2014), British politician
Tony Blackburn (born 1943), British disc jockey
Tony Brooks-James (born 1994), American football player
Tony Brown (disambiguation), multiple people
Tony Burke (born 1969), Australian politician
Tony Compagno (1921–1971), American football player
Tony Cook (disambiguation), multiple people
Tony Corbin (born 1974), American football player
Tony Costa (1944–1974), American serial killer
Tony Cristiani, American football player
Tony Curtis (1925–2010), American actor
Tony Danza (born 1951), American actor
Tony Diaz, Dominican baseball coach
Tony Discenzo (1936–2007), American football player
Tony Douglas (singer) (1929–2013), American country music singer
Tony Drago (born 1965), Maltese snooker player
Tony Evers (born 1951), American politician
Tony Fernandes (born 1964), Malaysian entrepreneur
Tony Fields (1958–1995), American dancer
Tony Fields II (born 1999), American football player
Tony Gaffney (born 1984), American basketball player
Tony Gara (1939–2006), Zimbabwean politician
Tony Gonsolin (born 1994), American baseball player
Tony Grosser, South Australian criminal who repeatedly shot at police in 1994
Tony Gwynn (1960–2014), American baseball player
Tony Hale (born 1970), American actor and comedian
Tony Hargain (born 1967), American football player
Tony Hart (1925–2009), English TV presenter
Tony Hawk (born 1968), American skateboarder
Tony Haynes (American musician) (born 1960), American lyricist, songwriter, author
Tony Haynes (English composer) (born 1941), British composer, musician and bandleader
Anthony "Tony" Holten, Irish writer
Tony Imba (born 1979), Malaysian murderer
Tony Iommi (born 1948), English guitarist for Black Sabbath
Tony Ippolito (1917–1951), American football player
Tony Jayawardena (born 1978), Sri Lankan British actor
Tony Jeffery (born 1964), American football player
Tony Johns (born 1960), Canadian football player
Tony Jones (disambiguation), multiple people
Tony Judt (1948–2010), British historian
Tony Kaska (1911–1994), American football player
Tony Kemp (baseball) (born 1991), American baseball player
Tony Kia (1966–2009), Singaporean triad leader and murderer
Tony La Russa (born 1944), American baseball manager
Tony Labrusca (born 1995), Filipino-American actor
Tony Leung Ka-Fai (born 1958), Hong Kong actor
Tony Leung Chiu-Wai (born 1962), Hong Kong actor
Tony Levine (born 1972), American football coach
Tony Liberatore (born 1966), Australian footballer
Tony Lockett (born 1966), Australian footballer
Tony Mansolino, American baseball coach
Tony Martin (American singer) (1913–2012), American actor and singer
Tony Mills (musician) (1962–2019), English musician, member of the bands Shy and TNT
Anthony Nwakaeme (born 1989), Nigerian footballer
Tony Parker (born 1982), French basketball player
Tony Parker (author) (1923–1996), British oral historian
Tony Parker (basketball, born 1993), American basketball player
Tony Perezchica (born 1966), American baseball player and coach
Antoinette Perry (1888–1946), American actress and director after whom the Tony Awards are named
Tony Piccolo (born 1960), Australian politician
Tony da Costa Pinho (born 1983), Brazilian footballer
Tony Poljan (born 1998), American football player
Tony Pollard (disambiguation), multiple people
Tony Popovic (born 1973), Australian football manager
Tony Randall (1920–2004), American actor
Tony Robbins (born 1960), American author and motivational speaker
Tony Romo (born 1980), American football player
Tony Ronaldson (born 1972), Australian basketball player
Anthony da Silva (born 1980), Portuguese footballer
Tony Samuels, American football player
Tony Santillan, American baseball player
Tony Satini (born 1993), Australian rugby player
Tony Sirico (1942–2022), American actor
Tony Slattery, English comedian and actor
Tony Smurfit, British-born Irish businessman
Tony Swatton, Anglo-American blacksmith
Tony Sylva (born 1975), Senegalese goalkeeper
Tony Taka, Japanese illustrator, video game artist and character designer
Tony Tan Caktiong (born 1953), Chinese-Filipino billionaire and business magnate
Tony Tan (born 1940), President of Singapore 2011–17
Tony Tchani (born 1989), Cameroonian footballer
Tony Thurman (born 1962), American football player
Tony Topham (1929–2004), British academic and writer
Tony Joe White (1943–2018), American singer-songwriter
Tony Vlachos (born 1973), American police officer and reality television personality
Tony Waiters (1937–2020), English footballer and manager
Tony Williams (rugby league) (born 1988), Australian rugby  player
Tony Wolters (born 1992), American baseball player
Tony Younger (born 1980), American-Israeli basketball player

Fictional characters
Fast Tony, in the 2006 animated film Ice Age: The Meltdown
Fat Tony (The Simpsons), a Mafia boss in the animated TV program The Simpsons
Anthony Mark "Tony" Banta, in American sitcom television series Taxi
Tony Chang, played by Michael Truong in the British web series Corner Shop Show
Tony DiMera, in the soap opera Days of Our Lives
Tony, a blue bird and Terence's cousin from Angry Birds Seasons
Tony Wah Chong Leonetti, in the American TV miniseries V (1983 miniseries) and V The Final Battle
Tony Micelli, in American sitcom television series Who's the Boss
Tony Montana, in the 1983 film Scarface
Tony Nelson, one of the main characters of the TV series I Dream of Jeannie, played by Larry Hagman
Tony Padilla, in the novel and Netflix series 13 Reasons Why
Tony Petrocelli, defense lawyer in the American TV series Petrocelli
Tony Prince, main protagonist of Grand Theft Auto: The Ballad of Gay Tony
Tony Soprano, main protagonist in The Sopranos TV series
Tony Stark, also known as Iron Man, in Marvel comics
Tony Stonem, in British TV series Skins
Tony the Tiger, cartoon mascot for Kellogg's Frosted Flakes breakfast cereal
Tony, an anthropomorphic clock from Don't Hug Me I'm Scared
 Tony, in the 1957 musical West Side Story

See also

Thony (name)
Tona (name)
Toni, name
Toney (name)
Tonny (name)
Tonye

Notes

English masculine given names
Hypocorisms
Lists of people by nickname